The Desulfobacteraceae are a family of Thermodesulfobacteriota. They reduce sulfates to sulfides to obtain energy and are strictly anaerobic. They have a respiratory and fermentative type of metabolism. Some species are chemolithotrophic and use inorganic materials to obtain energy and use hydrogen as their electron donor.

Biology and biochemistry

Morphology 
Desulfobacteraceae vary widely in shape and size across the family. Desulfofaba are straight or slightly curved rods that range in size from 0.8 to 2.1 x 3.2-6.1 μm. Those in the genus Desulfobacterium are spherical or oval shaped and somewhat smaller, ranging in size from 0.9 to 1.3 x 1.5-3.0 μm or 1.5-2.0 x 2.0-2.5 μm. They stain Gram-negative and are not known to produce spores. Some species contain a single polar flagellum used for motility.

Genus and species of Desulfobacteraceae may only be definitively distinguished by analysis of 16S rDNA sequences, but certain genera may be determined through physiological characteristics alone. Desulfofrigus displays an optimal growth rate at very low temperatures compared to other sulfate reducing bacteria. It is also unable to grow in the presence of propionate.

Metabolism 
Most species of Desulfobacteraceae use sulfur compounds as their main energy source. The most common source used is sulfate which, through metabolic processes, is reduced to sulfide. In an environment with little or no sulfate, sulfite or elemental sulfur may also be used and reduced into sulfide. In rare cases nitrate may also be used as a food source and reduced into ammonia. They have very efficient sulfate reduction rates (between 12 and 423 mu mol/dm3 day−1) in optimal conditions.

Habitat 
Desulfobacteraceae may be found in a range of locations but are most often found in saline and hypersaline waters including salt lakes and the ocean. They have also been found in polar ice in Antarctica. They may be found trapped within ice, floating within the water column, or living on or in other organisms such as sea sponges.

References 
Notes

Sources
 Ahn, Y.-B., L. J. Kerkhof, and M. M. Haggblom. "Desulfoluna Spongiiphila Sp. Nov., a Dehalogenating Bacterium in the Desulfobacteraceae from the Marine Sponge Aplysina Aerophoba." International Journal of Systematic And Evolutionary Microbiology 59.9 (2009): 2133–139.
 Foti, M., D. Y. Sorokin, B. Lomans, M. Mussman, E. E. Zacharova, N. V. Pimenov, J. G. Kuenen, and G. Muyzer. "Diversity, Activity, and Abundance of Sulfate-Reducing Bacteria in Saline and Hypersaline Soda Lakes." Applied and Environmental Microbiology 73.7 (2007): 2093–100.
 Garrity, George M.; Brenner, Don J.; Krieg, Noel R.; Staley, James T. (eds.) (2005). Bergey's Manual of Systematic Bacteriology, Volume Two: The Proteobacteria, Part C: The Alpha-, Beta-, Delta-, and Epsilonproteobacteria. New York, New York: Springer. .
 Purcell, Alicia M. et al. “Microbial Sulfur Transformations in Sediments from Subglacial Lake Whillans.” Frontiers in Microbiology 5 (2014): 594. PMC. Web. 20 Oct. 2015.

Desulfobacterales